Douglas McLelland was a Scottish amateur football centre forward who made over 130 appearances in the Scottish League for Queen's Park. He represented Scotland at amateur level.

References

1905 births
Scottish footballers
Scottish Football League players
Queen's Park F.C. players
Place of death missing
Date of death missing
Place of birth missing
Association football forwards
Scotland amateur international footballers
Footballers from North Ayrshire
People from Dalry, North Ayrshire